Olson Kundig, is an American architectural firm based in Seattle, run by architects Jim Olson and Tom Kundig. Founded by Olson in 1966, the firm’s work has grown to encompass museums, commercial and mixed-use design, exhibit design, interior design, places of worship, and residences, often for art collectors. Olson Kundig was awarded the 2009 AIA Architecture Firm Award (as Olson Sundberg Kundig Allen Architects) from the American Institute of Architects.

History 
The firm, founded by Jim Olson, has been in business since 1966. Principal and owners have included Jim Olson, Tom Kundig, Rick Sundberg, Kirsten R. Murray, Alan Maskin and Kevin M. Kudo-King. The firm changed its name from Olson Sundberg Kundig Allen Architects to Olson Kundig on January 1, 2010.

The firm launched an interiors studio in 2000. Their first line of accessories, The Tom Kundig Collection, debuted in 2012. In 2022, the firm expanded to New York City, its first office outside of Seattle since 1966.

Notable works
Olson Kundig designed a space for the Gethsemane Lutheran Church in downtown Seattle. The project involves renovation of an existing 1950s building to integrate it into an evolving urban context and construction of 50 new housing apartments.

In 2016, Olson Kundig won the competition for a children's museum annex to the Jewish Museum Berlin.
 The Burke Museum, Seattle (2019)
 Noah’s Ark Exhibit, Skirball Cultural Center, Los Angeles (2007)
 Delta Shelter, Washington (2004)
 Chicken Point Cabin, Idaho (2003)
 Pratt Fine Arts Center, Seattle (2002)
 The Brain, Seattle (2001)
 Mission Hill Winery, Westbank, British Columbia (2001)
 Ridge House, Washington (2001)
 Red House, Denver (1999)
 Studio House, Seattle (1998)
 Frye Art Museum, Seattle (1997)
 Hillclimb Court Building, Seattle (1985)
 Gallery House, Seattle (1985)
 Pike & Virginia Building, Seattle (1978)
 Earth House, Washington (1969)

Awards and honors
The firm has won more than 70 regional and national AIA awards, as well as awards from the Chicago Athenaeum. Tom Kundig was awarded the 2008 National Design Award in Architecture from the Cooper-Hewitt, National Design Museum, an Academy Award in Architecture from the American Academy of Arts and Letters in 2007, and the Emerging Architecture Award from the Architectural League of New York in 2004. Jim Olson received the AIA Seattle Medal of Honor in 2007. The firm's work has been published in the New York Times, Architectural Digest, and Architectural Record, among other publications.

Further reading
 Olson, Jim. Jim Olson: Art in Architecture. Whatcom Museum/August Editions, 2013
 Kundig, Tom. Tom Kundig: Houses 2. Princeton Architectural Press, 2011
 Olson Sundberg Kundig Allen. Jim Olson Houses. The Monacelli Press, 2009
 Riordan, John and Kristen Becker. The Good Office: Green Design on the Cutting Edge. New York: Collins Design, 2008.
 Beck, Petyr, ed. The Frye Art Museum: Olson Sundberg Kundig Allen Architects. Documentary Media, 2007.
 Ngo, Dung. Art + Architecture: The Ebsworth Collection & Residence, William Stout Publishers, 2006.
 Ngo, Dung. Tom Kundig: Houses. Princeton Architectural Press, 2006.
 Ojeda, Oscar Riera, ed. Olson Sundberg Kundig Allen Architects: Architecture, Art, and Craft. The Monacelli Press, 2001.

References

External links 
 Official website
 National AIA Architecture Firm of the Year award
 "A Glass House in Farm Country" Juliet Chung, The Wall Street Journal, 6 August 2010

Architecture firms based in Washington (state)
Companies based in Seattle